Selma Carlicia Kamanya (born December 31, 1996, in Windhoek) is a Namibian model and beauty pageant titleholder who won Miss Namibia 2018 on July 7, 2018. She represented Namibia at Miss Universe 2018 pageant.

Personal life
Kamanya lives in Windhoek, Namibia. She holds a Diploma in Economics and is studying for a degree at the Namibia University of Science and Technology (NUST).

Pageantry

Miss Namibia 2018
Kamanya was crowned as Miss Namibia 2018 pageant on 7 July 2018 at the Windhoek Country Club. She succeeded outgoing Miss Namibia 2017 Suné January.

Miss Universe 2018
Kamanya represented Namibia at Miss Universe 2018 pageant.

References

External links
missnamibia.com.na
missuniverse.com

Living people
1997 births
Miss Universe 2018 contestants
Namibian female models
Namibian beauty pageant winners